Discoclaoxylon is a plant genus of the family Euphorbiaceae, first described in 1914. It is native to western and central Africa, including islands in the Gulf of Guinea.

Species
 Discoclaoxylon hexandrum (Müll.Arg.) Pax & K.Hoffm. - Ghana, Guinea, Ivory Coast, Sierra Leone, Nigeria, Cameroon, Gabon, Central African Republic, Equatorial Guinea, São Tomé, Congo-Brazzaville, Zaire, Uganda 
 Discoclaoxylon occidentale (Müll.Arg.) Pax & K.Hoffm. - São Tomé
 Discoclaoxylon pedicellare (Müll.Arg.) Pax & K.Hoffm. - Bioko
 Discoclaoxylon pubescens (Pax & K.Hoffm.) Exell - Annobón

References

Acalypheae
Flora of Africa
Euphorbiaceae genera